[[File:Image3,5-Diskette removed.jpg|thumbnail|A -inch floppy disk removed from its housing]]
A floppy disk or floppy diskette (casually referred to as a floppy or a diskette) is an obsolescent type of disk storage composed of a thin and flexible disk of a magnetic storage medium in a square or nearly square plastic enclosure lined with a fabric that removes dust particles from the spinning disk. Floppy disks store digital data which can be read and written when the disk is inserted into a floppy disk drive (FDD) connected to or inside a computer or other device.

Subsequently, the 5¼-inch and then the 3½-inch became a ubiquitous form of data storage and transfer into the first years of the 21st century. 3½-inch floppy disks can still be used with an external USB floppy disk drive. USB drives for 5¼-inch, 8-inch, and other-size floppy disks are rare to non-existent. Some individuals and organizations continue to use older equipment to read or transfer data from floppy disks.

Floppy disks were so common in late 20th-century culture that many electronic and software programs continue to use save icons that look like floppy disks well into the 21st century, as a form of skeuomorphic design. While floppy disk drives still have some limited uses, especially with legacy industrial computer equipment, they have been superseded by data storage methods with much greater data storage capacity and data transfer speed, such as USB flash drives, memory cards, optical discs, and storage available through local computer networks and cloud storage.

History

These disks and associated drives were produced and improved upon by IBM and other companies such as Memorex, Shugart Associates, and Burroughs Corporation. The term "floppy disk" appeared in print as early as 1970, and although IBM announced its first media as the Type 1 Diskette in 1973, the industry continued to use the terms "floppy disk" or "floppy".

In 1976, Shugart Associates introduced the 5¼-inch FDD. By 1978, there were more than ten manufacturers producing such FDDs. There were competing floppy disk formats, with hard- and soft-sector versions and encoding schemes such as differential Manchester encoding (DM), modified frequency modulation (MFM), M2FM and group coded recording (GCR). The 5¼-inch format displaced the 8-inch one for most uses, and the hard-sectored disk format disappeared. The most common capacity of the 5¼-inch format in DOS-based PCs was 360 KB (368,640 bytes) for the Double-Sided Double-Density (DSDD) format using MFM encoding. In 1984, IBM introduced with its PC/AT the 1.2 MB (1,228,800 bytes) dual-sided 5¼-inch floppy disk, but it never became very popular. IBM started using the 720 KB double density 3½-inch microfloppy disk on its Convertible laptop computer in 1986 and the 1.44 MB high-density version with the IBM Personal System/2 (PS/2) line in 1987. These disk drives could be added to older PC models. In 1988, Y-E Data introduced a drive for 2.88 MB Double-Sided Extended-Density (DSED) diskettes which was used by IBM in its top-of-the-line PS/2 and some RS/6000 models and in the second-generation NeXTcube and NeXTstation; however, this format had limited market success due to lack of standards and movement to 1.44 MB drives.

Throughout the early 1980s, limits of the 5¼-inch format became clear. Originally designed to be more practical than the 8-inch format, it was becoming considered too large; as the quality of recording media grew, data could be stored in a smaller area. Several solutions were developed, with drives at 2-, 2½-, 3-, 3¼-, 3½- and 4-inches (and Sony's  disk) offered by various companies. They all had several advantages over the old format, including a rigid case with a sliding metal (or later, sometimes plastic) shutter over the head slot, which helped protect the delicate magnetic medium from dust and damage, and a sliding write protection tab, which was far more convenient than the adhesive tabs used with earlier disks. The large market share of the well-established 5¼-inch format made it difficult for these diverse mutually-incompatible new formats to gain significant market share. A variant on the Sony design, introduced in 1982 by many manufacturers, was then rapidly adopted. By 1988, the 3½-inch was outselling the 5¼-inch.

Generally, the term floppy disk persisted, even though later style floppy disks have a rigid case around an internal floppy disk.

By the end of the 1980s, 5¼-inch disks had been superseded by 3½-inch disks. During this time, PCs frequently came equipped with drives of both sizes. By the mid-1990s, 5¼-inch drives had virtually disappeared, as the 3½-inch disk became the predominant floppy disk. The advantages of the 3½-inch disk were its higher capacity, its smaller physical size, and its rigid case which provided better protection from dirt and other environmental risks.

Prevalence

Floppy disks became commonplace during the 1980s and 1990s in their use with personal computers to distribute software, transfer data, and create backups. Before hard disks became affordable to the general population, floppy disks were often used to store a computer's operating system (OS). Most home computers from that time have an elementary OS and BASIC stored in read-only memory (ROM), with the option of loading a more advanced OS from a floppy disk.

By the early 1990s, the increasing software size meant large packages like Windows or Adobe Photoshop required a dozen disks or more. In 1996, there were an estimated five billion standard floppy disks in use. Then, distribution of larger packages was gradually replaced by CD-ROMs, DVDs, and online distribution.

An attempt to enhance the existing 3½-inch designs was the SuperDisk in the late 1990s, using very narrow data tracks and a high precision head guidance mechanism with a capacity of 120 MB and backward-compatibility with standard 3½-inch floppies; a format war briefly occurred between SuperDisk and other high-density floppy-disk products, although ultimately recordable CDs/DVDs, solid-state flash storage, and eventually cloud-based online storage would render all these removable disk formats obsolete. External USB-based floppy disk drives are still available, and many modern systems provide firmware support for booting from such drives.

Gradual transition to other formats

In the mid-1990s, mechanically incompatible higher-density floppy disks were introduced, like the Iomega Zip disk. Adoption was limited by the competition between proprietary formats and the need to buy expensive drives for computers where the disks would be used. In some cases, failure in market penetration was exacerbated by the release of higher-capacity versions of the drive and media being not backward-compatible with the original drives, dividing the users between new and old adopters. Consumers were wary of making costly investments into unproven and rapidly changing technologies, so none of the technologies became the established standard.

Apple introduced the iMac G3 in 1998 with a CD-ROM drive but no floppy drive; this made USB-connected floppy drives popular accessories, as the iMac came without any writable removable media device.

Recordable CDs were touted as an alternative, because of the greater capacity, compatibility with existing CD-ROM drives, and—with the advent of re-writeable CDs and packet writing—a similar reusability as floppy disks. However, CD-R/RWs remained mostly an archival medium, not a medium for exchanging data or editing files on the medium itself, because there was no common standard for packet writing which allowed for small updates. Other formats, such as magneto-optical discs, had the flexibility of floppy disks combined with greater capacity, but remained niche due to costs. High-capacity backward compatible floppy technologies became popular for a while and were sold as an option or even included in standard PCs, but in the long run, their use was limited to professionals and enthusiasts.

Flash-based USB-thumb drives finally were a practical and popular replacement, that supported traditional file systems and all common usage scenarios of floppy disks. As opposed to other solutions, no new drive type or special software was required that impeded adoption, since all that was necessary was an already common USB port.

Usage in the 21st century

By 2002, most manufacturers still provided floppy disk drives as standard equipment to meet user demand for file-transfer and an emergency boot device, as well as for the general secure feeling of having the familiar device. By this time, the retail cost of a floppy drive had fallen to around $20, so there was little financial incentive to omit the device from a system. Subsequently, enabled by the widespread support for USB flash drives and BIOS boot, manufacturers and retailers progressively reduced the availability of floppy disk drives as standard equipment. In February 2003, Dell, one of the leading personal computer vendors, announced that floppy drives would no longer be pre-installed on Dell Dimension home computers, although they were still available as a selectable option and purchasable as an aftermarket OEM add-on. By January 2007, only 2% of computers sold in stores contained built-in floppy disk drives.

Floppy disks are used for emergency boots in aging systems lacking support for other bootable media and for BIOS updates, since most BIOS and firmware programs can still be executed from bootable floppy disks. If BIOS updates fail or become corrupt, floppy drives can sometimes be used to perform a recovery. The music and theatre industries still use equipment requiring standard floppy disks (e.g. synthesizers, samplers, drum machines, sequencers, and lighting consoles). Industrial automation equipment such as programmable machinery and industrial robots may not have a USB interface; data and programs are then loaded from disks, damageable in industrial environments. This equipment may not be replaced due to cost or requirement for continuous availability; existing software emulation and virtualization do not solve this problem because a customized operating system is used that has no drivers for USB devices. Hardware floppy disk emulators can be made to interface floppy-disk controllers to a USB port that can be used for flash drives.

In May 2016, the United States Government Accountability Office released a report that covered the need to upgrade or replace legacy computer systems within federal agencies. According to this document, old IBM Series/1 minicomputers running on 8-inch floppy disks are still used to coordinate "the operational functions of the United States' nuclear forces". The government planned to update some of the technology by the end of the 2017 fiscal year.

Windows 10 and Windows 11 no longer comes with drivers for floppy disk drives (both internal and external). However, they will still support them with a separate device driver provided by Microsoft.

The British Airways Boeing 747-400 fleet, up to its retirement in 2020, used 3.5-inch floppy disks to load avionics software.

Some workstations in corporate computing environments still retained floppy disks while disabling USB ports, both moves done to restrict the amount of data that could be copied by unscrupulous employees.

Sony, who had been in the floppy disk business since 1983, ended domestic sales of all six 3.5-inch floppy disk models as of March 2011. This has been viewed by some as the end of the floppy disk. While production of new floppy disk media has ceased, sales and uses of this media from inventories is expected to continue until at least 2026.

Legacy

For more than two decades, the floppy disk was the primary external writable storage device used. Most computing environments before the 1990s were non-networked, and floppy disks were the primary means to transfer data between computers, a method known informally as sneakernet. Unlike hard disks, floppy disks are handled and seen; even a novice user can identify a floppy disk. Because of these factors, a picture of a 3½-inch floppy disk became an interface metaphor for saving data. The floppy disk symbol is still used by software on user-interface elements related to saving files (such as Microsoft Office 2021) even though physical floppy disks are largely obsolete.

Design
Structure
8-inch and 5¼-inch disks

The 8-inch and 5¼-inch floppy disks contain a magnetically coated round plastic medium with a large circular hole in the center for a drive's spindle. The medium is contained in a square plastic cover that has a small oblong opening in both sides to allow the drive's heads to read and write data and a large hole in the center to allow the magnetic medium to spin by rotating it from its middle hole.

Inside the cover are two layers of fabric with the magnetic medium sandwiched in the middle. The fabric is designed to reduce friction between the medium and the outer cover, and catch particles of debris abraded off the disk to keep them from accumulating on the heads. The cover is usually a one-part sheet, double-folded with flaps glued or spot-welded together.

A small notch on the side of the disk identifies that it is writable, detected by a mechanical switch or phototransistor above it; if it is not present, the disk can be written; in the 8-inch disk the notch is covered to enable writing while in the 5¼-inch disk the notch is open to enable writing. Tape may be used over the notch to change the mode of the disk. Punch devices were sold to convert read-only disks to writable ones and enable writing on the unused side of single sided disks; such modified disks became known as flippy disks.

Another LED/photo-transistor pair located near the center of the disk detects the index hole once per rotation in the magnetic disk; it is used to detect the angular start of each track and whether or not the disk is rotating at the correct speed. Early 8‑inch and 5¼‑inch disks had physical holes for each sector and were termed hard sectored disks. Later soft-sectored disks have only one index hole, and sector position is determined by the disk controller or low-level software from patterns marking the start of a sector. Generally, the same drives are used to read and write both types of disks, with only the disks and controllers differing. Some operating systems using soft sectors, such as Apple DOS, do not use the index hole, and the drives designed for such systems often lack the corresponding sensor; this was mainly a hardware cost-saving measure.

3½-inch disk

The core of the 3½-inch disk is the same as the other two disks, but the front has only a label and a small opening for reading and writing data, protected by the shutter—a spring-loaded metal or plastic cover, pushed to the side on entry into the drive. Rather than having a hole in the center, it has a metal hub which mates to the spindle of the drive. Typical 3½-inch disk magnetic coating materials are:

 DD: 2 μm magnetic iron oxide
 HD: 1.2 μm cobalt-doped iron oxide
 ED: 3 μm barium ferrite

Two holes at the bottom left and right indicate whether the disk is write-protected and whether it is high-density; these holes are spaced as far apart as the holes in punched A4 paper, allowing write-protected high-density floppies to be clipped into standard ring binders. The dimensions of the disk shell are not quite square: its width is slightly less than its depth, so that it is impossible to insert the disk into a drive slot sideways (i.e. rotated 90 degrees from the correct shutter-first orientation). A diagonal notch at top right ensures that the disk is inserted into the drive in the correct orientation—not upside down or label-end first—and an arrow at top left indicates direction of insertion. The drive usually has a button that, when pressed, ejects the disk with varying degrees of force, the discrepancy due to the ejection force provided by the spring of the shutter. In IBM PC compatibles, Commodores, Apple II/IIIs, and other non-Apple-Macintosh machines with standard floppy disk drives, a disk may be ejected manually at any time. The drive has a disk-change switch that detects when a disk is ejected or inserted. Failure of this mechanical switch is a common source of disk corruption if a disk is changed and the drive (and hence the operating system) fails to notice.

One of the chief usability problems of the floppy disk is its vulnerability; even inside a closed plastic housing, the disk medium is highly sensitive to dust, condensation and temperature extremes. As with all magnetic storage, it is vulnerable to magnetic fields. Blank disks have been distributed with an extensive set of warnings, cautioning the user not to expose it to dangerous conditions. Rough treatment or removing the disk from the drive while the magnetic media is still spinning is likely to cause damage to the disk, drive head, or stored data. On the other hand, the 3½‑inch floppy has been lauded for its mechanical usability by human–computer interaction expert Donald Norman:

Operation

A spindle motor in the drive rotates the magnetic medium at a certain speed, while a stepper motor-operated mechanism moves the magnetic read/write heads radially along the surface of the disk. Both read and write operations require the media to be rotating and the head to contact the disk media, an action originally accomplished by a disk-load solenoid. Later drives held the heads out of contact until a front-panel lever was rotated (5¼-inch) or disk insertion was complete (3½-inch). To write data, current is sent through a coil in the head as the media rotates. The head's magnetic field aligns the magnetization of the particles directly below the head on the media. When the current is reversed the magnetization aligns in the opposite direction, encoding one bit of data. To read data, the magnetization of the particles in the media induce a tiny voltage in the head coil as they pass under it. This small signal is amplified and sent to the floppy disk controller, which converts the streams of pulses from the media into data, checks it for errors, and sends it to the host computer system.

Formatting

A blank unformatted diskette has a coating of magnetic oxide with no magnetic order to the particles. During formatting, the magnetizations of the particles are aligned forming tracks, each broken up into sectors, enabling the controller to properly read and write data. The tracks are concentric rings around the center, with spaces between tracks where no data is written; gaps with padding bytes are provided between the sectors and at the end of the track to allow for slight speed variations in the disk drive, and to permit better interoperability with disk drives connected to other similar systems.

Each sector of data has a header that identifies the sector location on the disk. A cyclic redundancy check (CRC) is written into the sector headers and at the end of the user data so that the disk controller can detect potential errors.

Some errors are soft and can be resolved by automatically re-trying the read operation; other errors are permanent and the disk controller will signal a failure to the operating system if multiple attempts to read the data still fail.

Insertion and ejection
After a disk is inserted, a catch or lever at the front of the drive is manually lowered to prevent the disk from accidentally emerging, engage the spindle clamping hub, and in two-sided drives, engage the second read/write head with the media.

In some 5¼-inch drives, insertion of the disk compresses and locks an ejection spring which partially ejects the disk upon opening the catch or lever. This enables a smaller concave area for the thumb and fingers to grasp the disk during removal.

Newer 5¼-inch drives and all 3½-inch drives automatically engage the spindle and heads when a disk is inserted, doing the opposite with the press of the eject button.

On Apple Macintosh computers with built-in 3½-inch disk drives, the ejection button is replaced by software controlling an ejection motor which only does so when the operating system no longer needs to access the drive. The user could drag the image of the floppy drive to the trash can on the desktop to eject the disk. In the case of a power failure or drive malfunction, a loaded disk can be removed manually by inserting a straightened paper clip into a small hole at the drive's front panel, just as one would do with a CD-ROM drive in a similar situation. The Sharp X68000 featured soft-eject 5¼-inch drives. Some late-generation IBM PS/2 machines had soft-eject 3½-inch disk drives as well for which some issues of DOS (i.e. PC DOS 5.02 and higher) offered an EJECT command.

Finding track zero
Before a disk can be accessed, the drive needs to synchronize its head position with the disk tracks. In some drives, this is accomplished with a Track Zero Sensor, while for others it involves the drive head striking an immobile reference surface.

In either case, the head is moved so that it is approaching track zero position of the disk. When a drive with the sensor has reached track zero, the head stops moving immediately and is correctly aligned. For a drive without the sensor, the mechanism attempts to move the head the maximum possible number of positions needed to reach track zero, knowing that once this motion is complete, the head will be positioned over track zero.

Some drive mechanisms such as the Apple II 5¼-inch drive without a track zero sensor, produce characteristic mechanical noises when trying to move the heads past the reference surface. This physical striking is responsible for the 5¼-inch drive clicking during the boot of an Apple II, and the loud rattles of its DOS and ProDOS when disk errors occurred and track zero synchronization was attempted.

Finding sectors
All 8-inch and some 5¼-inch drives used a mechanical method to locate sectors, known as either hard sectors or soft sectors, and is the purpose of the small hole in the jacket, off to the side of the spindle hole. A light beam sensor detects when a punched hole in the disk is visible through the hole in the jacket.

For a soft-sectored disk, there is only a single hole, which is used to locate the first sector of each track. Clock timing is then used to find the other sectors behind it, which requires precise speed regulation of the drive motor.

For a hard-sectored disk, there are many holes, one for each sector row, plus an additional hole in a half-sector position, that is used to indicate sector zero.

The Apple II computer system is notable in that it did not have an index hole sensor and ignored the presence of hard or soft sectoring. Instead, it used special repeating data synchronization patterns written to the disk between each sector, to assist the computer in finding and synchronizing with the data in each track.

The later 3½-inch drives of the mid-1980s did not use sector index holes, but instead also used synchronization patterns.

Most 3½-inch drives used a constant speed drive motor and contain the same number of sectors across all tracks. This is sometimes referred to as Constant Angular Velocity (CAV). In order to fit more data onto a disk, some 3½-inch drives (notably the Macintosh External 400K and 800K drives) instead use Constant Linear Velocity (CLV), which uses a variable speed drive motor that spins more slowly as the head moves away from the center of the disk, maintaining the same speed of the head(s) relative to the surface(s) of the disk. This allows more sectors to be written to the longer middle and outer tracks as the track length increases.

Sizes

While the original IBM 8-inch disk was actually so defined, the other sizes are defined in the metric system, their usual names being but rough approximations.

Different sizes of floppy disks are mechanically incompatible, and disks can fit only one size of drive. Drive assemblies with both -inch and -inch slots were available during the transition period between the sizes, but they contained two separate drive mechanisms. In addition, there are many subtle, usually software-driven incompatibilities between the two. -inch disks formatted for use with Apple II computers would be unreadable and treated as unformatted on a Commodore. As computer platforms began to form, attempts were made at interchangeability. For example, the "SuperDrive" included from the Macintosh SE to the Power Macintosh G3 could read, write and format IBM PC format -inch disks, but few IBM-compatible computers had drives that did the reverse. 8-inch, -inch and -inch drives were manufactured in a variety of sizes, most to fit standardized drive bays. Alongside the common disk sizes were non-classical sizes for specialized systems.

8-inch floppy disk

Floppy disks of the first standard are 8 inches in diameter, protected by a flexible plastic jacket. It was a read-only device used by IBM as a way of loading microcode. Read/write floppy disks and their drives became available in 1972, but it was IBM's 1973 introduction of the 3740 data entry system that began the establishment of floppy disks, called by IBM the Diskette 1, as an industry standard for information interchange. Formatted diskette for this system store 242,944 bytes. Early microcomputers used for engineering, business, or word processing often used one or more 8-inch disk drives for removable storage; the CP/M operating system was developed for microcomputers with 8-inch drives.

The family of 8-inch disks and drives increased over time and later versions could store up to 1.2 MB; many microcomputer applications did not need that much capacity on one disk, so a smaller size disk with lower-cost media and drives was feasible. The -inch drive succeeded the 8-inch size in many applications, and developed to about the same storage capacity as the original 8-inch size, using higher-density media and recording techniques.

5.25-inch floppy disk

The head gap of an 80‑track high-density (1.2 MB in the MFM format) ‑inch drive (a.k.a. Mini diskette, Mini disk, or Minifloppy) is smaller than that of a 40‑track double-density (360 KB if double-sided) drive but can also format, read and write 40‑track disks provided the controller supports double stepping or has a switch to do so. -inch 80-track drives were also called hyper drives. A blank 40‑track disk formatted and written on an 80‑track drive can be taken to its native drive without problems, and a disk formatted on a 40‑track drive can be used on an 80‑track drive. Disks written on a 40‑track drive and then updated on an 80 track drive become unreadable on any 40‑track drives due to track width incompatibility.

Single-sided disks were coated on both sides, despite the availability of more expensive double sided disks. The reason usually given for the higher price was that double sided disks were certified error-free on both sides of the media. Double-sided disks could be used in some drives for single-sided disks, as long as an index signal was not needed. This was done one side at a time, by turning them over (flippy disks); more expensive dual-head drives which could read both sides without turning over were later produced, and eventually became used universally.

3.5-inch floppy disk

In the early 1980s, many manufacturers introduced smaller floppy drives and media in various formats. A consortium of 21 companies eventually settled on a -inch design known as the Micro diskette, Micro disk, or Micro floppy, similar to a Sony design but improved to support both single-sided and double-sided media, with formatted capacities generally of 360 KB and 720 KB respectively. Single-sided drives shipped in 1983, and double-sided in 1984. The double-sided, high-density 1.44 MB (actually 1440 KiB = 1.41 MiB) disk drive, which would become the most popular, first shipped in 1986. The first Macintosh computers used single-sided -inch floppy disks, but with 400 KB formatted capacity. These were followed in 1986 by double-sided 800 KB floppies. The higher capacity was achieved at the same recording density by varying the disk-rotation speed with head position so that the linear speed of the disk was closer to constant. Later Macs could also read and write 1.44 MB HD disks in PC format with fixed rotation speed. Higher capacities were similarly achieved by Acorn's RISC OS (800 KB for DD, 1,600 KB for HD) and AmigaOS (880 KB for DD, 1,760 KB for HD).

All -inch disks have a rectangular hole in one corner which, if obstructed, write-enables the disk. A sliding detented piece can be moved to block or reveal the part of the rectangular hole that is sensed by the drive. The HD 1.44 MB disks have a second, unobstructed hole in the opposite corner that identifies them as being of that capacity.

In IBM-compatible PCs, the three densities of -inch floppy disks are backwards-compatible; higher-density drives can read, write and format lower-density media. It is also possible to format a disk at a lower density than that for which it was intended, but only if the disk is first thoroughly demagnetized with a bulk eraser, as the high-density format is magnetically stronger and will prevent the disk from working in lower-density modes.

Writing at different densities than those at which disks were intended, sometimes by altering or drilling holes, was possible but not supported by manufacturers. A hole on one side of a -inch disk can be altered as to make some disk drives and operating systems treat the disk as one of higher or lower density, for bidirectional compatibility or economical reasons. Some computers, such as the PS/2 and Acorn Archimedes, ignored these holes altogether.

Other sizes

Other smaller floppy sizes were proposed, especially for portable or pocket-sized devices that needed a smaller storage device.
 3¼-inch floppies otherwise similar to 5¼-inch floppies were proposed by Tabor and Dysan.
 Three-inch disks similar in construction to 3½-inch were manufactured and used for a time, particularly by Amstrad computers and word processors.
 A two-inch nominal size known as the Video Floppy was introduced by Sony for use with its Mavica still video camera.
 An incompatible two-inch floppy produced by Fujifilm called the LT-1 was used in the Zenith Minisport portable computer.
None of these sizes achieved much market success.

Sizes, performance and capacity

Floppy disk size is often referred to in inches, even in countries using metric and though the size is defined in metric. The ANSI specification of -inch disks is entitled in part "90 mm (3.5-inch)" though 90 mm is closer to 3.54 inches. Formatted capacities are generally set in terms of kilobytes and megabytes.

Data is generally written to floppy disks in sectors (angular blocks) and tracks (concentric rings at a constant radius). For example, the HD format of 3½-inch floppy disks uses 512 bytes per sector, 18 sectors per track, 80 tracks per side and two sides, for a total of 1,474,560 bytes per disk. Some disk controllers can vary these parameters at the user's request, increasing storage on the disk, although they may not be able to be read on machines with other controllers. For example, Microsoft applications were often distributed on -inch 1.68 MB DMF disks formatted with 21 sectors instead of 18; they could still be recognized by a standard controller. On the IBM PC, MSX and most other microcomputer platforms, disks were written using a constant angular velocity (CAV) format, with the disk spinning at a constant speed and the sectors holding the same amount of information on each track regardless of radial location.

Because the sectors have constant angular size, the 512 bytes in each sector are compressed more near the disk's center. A more space-efficient technique would be to increase the number of sectors per track toward the outer edge of the disk, from 18 to 30 for instance, thereby keeping nearly constant the amount of physical disk space used for storing each sector; an example is zone bit recording. Apple implemented this in early Macintosh computers by spinning the disk more slowly when the head was at the edge, while maintaining the data rate, allowing 400 KB of storage per side and an extra 80 KB on a double-sided disk. This higher capacity came with a disadvantage: the format used a unique drive mechanism and control circuitry, meaning that Mac disks could not be read on other computers. Apple eventually reverted to constant angular velocity on HD floppy disks with their later machines, still unique to Apple as they supported the older variable-speed formats.

Disk formatting is usually done by a utility program supplied by the computer OS manufacturer; generally, it sets up a file storage directory system on the disk, and initializes its sectors and tracks. Areas of the disk unusable for storage due to flaws can be locked (marked as "bad sectors") so that the operating system does not attempt to use them. This was time-consuming so many environments had quick formatting which skipped the error checking process. When floppy disks were often used, disks pre-formatted for popular computers were sold. The unformatted capacity of a floppy disk does not include the sector and track headings of a formatted disk; the difference in storage between them depends on the drive's application. Floppy disk drive and media manufacturers specify the unformatted capacity (for example, 2 MB for a standard -inch HD floppy). It is implied that this should not be exceeded, since doing so will most likely result in performance problems. DMF was introduced permitting 1.68 MB to fit onto an otherwise standard -inch disk; utilities then appeared allowing disks to be formatted as such.

Mixtures of decimal prefixes and binary sector sizes require care to properly calculate total capacity. Whereas semiconductor memory naturally favors powers of two (size doubles each time an address pin is added to the integrated circuit), the capacity of a disk drive is the product of sector size, sectors per track, tracks per side and sides (which in hard disk drives with multiple platters can be greater than 2). Although other sector sizes have been known in the past, formatted sector sizes are now almost always set to powers of two (256 bytes, 512 bytes, etc.), and, in some cases, disk capacity is calculated as multiples of the sector size rather than only in bytes, leading to a combination of decimal multiples of sectors and binary sector sizes. For example, 1.44 MB -inch HD disks have the "M" prefix peculiar to their context, coming from their capacity of 2,880 512-byte sectors (1,440 KiB), consistent with neither a decimal megabyte nor a binary mebibyte (MiB). Hence, these disks hold 1.47 MB or 1.41 MiB. Usable data capacity is a function of the disk format used, which in turn is determined by the FDD controller and its settings. Differences between such formats can result in capacities ranging from approximately 1,300 to 1,760 KiB (1.80 MB) on a standard -inch high-density floppy (and up to nearly 2 MB with utilities such as 2M/2MGUI). The highest capacity techniques require much tighter matching of drive head geometry between drives, something not always possible and unreliable. For example, the LS-240 drive supports a 32 MB capacity on standard -inch HD disks, but this is a write-once technique, and requires its own drive.

The raw maximum transfer rate of -inch ED floppy drives (2.88 MB) is nominally 1,000 kilobits/s, or approximately 83% that of single-speed CD‑ROM (71% of audio CD). This represents the speed of raw data bits moving under the read head; however, the effective speed is somewhat less due to space used for headers, gaps and other format fields and can be even further reduced by delays to seek between tracks.

See also

 Berg connector for 3½-inch floppy drive
 dd (Unix)
 Disk image
 Don't Copy That Floppy
 Floppy disk controller
 Floppy disk hardware emulator
 Floppy disk variants
 Hard disk drive
 History of the floppy disk
 List of floppy disk formats
 Shugart bus – popular mainly for 8-inch drives, and partially for 5¼-inch
 XDF
 VGA-Copy copy tool (retries on errors, over-formatted floppies), DOS, discontinued
 Zip drive

Notes

References

Further reading
 Weyhrich, Steven (2005). "The Disk II": A detailed essay describing one of the first commercial floppy disk drives (from the Apple II History website).
 Immers, Richard; Neufeld, Gerald G. (1984). Inside Commodore DOS: The Complete Guide to the 1541 Disk Operating System. Datamost & Reston Publishing Company (Prentice-Hall). .
 Englisch, Lothar; Szczepanowski, Norbert (1984). The Anatomy of the 1541 Disk Drive''. Grand Rapids, Michigan, USA, Abacus Software (translated from the original 1983 German edition, Düsseldorf, Data Becker GmbH). .
 Hewlett Packard: 9121D/S Disc Memory Operator's Manual; printed 1 September 1982; part number 09121-90000.

External links

 HowStuffWorks: How Floppy Disk Drives Work
 Computer Hope: Information about computer floppy drives
 NCITS (mention of ANSI X3.162 and X3.171 floppy standards)
 Floppy disk drives and media technical information
 The Floppy User Guide -historical technical material
 Summary of Floppy Disk Types and Specifications

1971 in computing
1971 in technology
American inventions
Computer-related introductions in 1971
Computer storage media
 
Rotating disc computer storage media
20th-century inventions
Legacy hardware